Alexander was launched in 1801 in the United States, possibly under another name. She became a slave ship, sailing from Liverpool. A French privateer captured her after she had landed her slaves at Berbice. Alexander returned to British ownership and became a West Indiaman, and then a transport. She was last listed in 1816 but may have been sold or broken up in 1815.

Career
Alexander first appeared in Lloyd's Register in 1806. 

Although LR gave Alexanders master's name as Prince, it was actually Pince. Captain Robert Pince acquired a letter of marque on 6 May 1806.

Captain Robert Pince sailed from Liverpool on 10 June 1806 to acquire slaves in West Africa. Alexander arrived at Berbice on 20 December with 347 slaves. She had left Liverpool with 42 crew members and she had suffered eight crew deaths on the voyage. She sailed from Liverpool on 17 February 1807.

The French privateer Alert, of 20 guns and 150–200 men, captured, Alexander, Pince, master, and Ann, Strahan, master, both of Liverpool, and took them into Guadeloupe. Alert also captured Harriet, Thompson, master, of Lancaster, but  recaptured Harriet. After she captured Alexander, Alerte captured Harriet. Alerte was the former .

Alexander quickly returned to British ownership, though it is not entirely clear how. She may have been the "English Ship Alexander, laden with Indigo, Cotton, Copper, and Dry Wood" that the Royal Navy captured in the harbour on 21 December 1807 when the Danish island of Saint Thomas capitulated to the forces under Rear-Admiral the Honourable Sir Alexander Cochrane.

Captain Josiah Perrin acquired a letter of marque on 23 September 1808.

In the middle of March 1810, an Alexander was on shore near Rio Grande. She was on her way from Liverpool to Pernambuco. Earlier, on 11 October 1809, Alexander, of Liverpool, Pince [sic], master, had arrived at Rio de Janeiro from Liverpool.
 

Alexander, Surflen, master, last appeared in Lloyd's Lists ship arrival and departure data as sailing from Cork on 18 January 1815, bound for Bermuda together with a number of other vessels. Alexander was last listed in 1816.

By early 1816 Captain Surflen was master of a different Alexander, sailing to India.

Citations

1801 ships
Ships built in the United States
Age of Sail merchant ships of England
Liverpool slave ships
Captured ships